Rovers FC or Rovers F.C. may refer to:

Rovers FC (Guam), a football team from Guam
Rovers FC (U.S. Virgin Islands), a football team from the U.S. Virgin Islands
Rovers F.C. (Glasgow)
Rovers F.C. (Mexico)